Dr Abraham Iyambo Senior Secondary School is a school in the Ohangwena Region of northern Namibia, situated   east of Eenhana. The school's original name was Oshikunde Senior Secondary School after the Oshikunde Constituency in which it is situated. After a major renovation in September 2014 it was renamed after the former Minister of Higher Education Abraham Iyambo. Dr Abraham Iyambo SSS is a government boarding school catering for grades 11 and 12.  it had 404 learners.

See also
 Education in Namibia
 List of schools in Namibia

References

Schools in Ohangwena Region